Angelos A. Lambrou (Αγγελος Λάμπρου, 4 June 1912 – 12 December 1992) was a Greek sprinter. He competed in the 100 m, 200 m and 4 × 100 m events at the 1928 and 1932 Summer Olympics, but failed to reach the finals.

References

1912 births
1992 deaths
Athletes from Athens
Greek male sprinters
Athletes (track and field) at the 1928 Summer Olympics
Athletes (track and field) at the 1932 Summer Olympics
Olympic athletes of Greece
20th-century Greek people